Charles Lockhart-Ross may refer to:

Sir Charles Lockhart-Ross, 7th Baronet (c. 1763–1814)
Sir Charles Lockhart-Ross, 8th Baronet (1812–1883), of the Lockhart-Ross baronets
Sir Charles Lockhart-Ross, 9th Baronet (1872–1942)

See also
Charles Lockhart (disambiguation)
Charles Ross (disambiguation)